Althepus indistinctus is a species of spider of the genus Althepus. It is endemic to Kalimantan in Indonesia.

References

Psilodercidae
Endemic fauna of Borneo
Spiders of Indonesia
Spiders described in 1995